Lawrence or Laurence Jones may refer to:

Lawrence Jones (businessman) (born 1968), British entrepreneur
Lawrence K. Jones, American counseling psychologist, career assessment developer and writer
Biff Jones (Lawrence Mcceney Jones, 1895–1980), college football coach
Lawrence B. Jones (born 1992), American conservative talk radio host, contributor to TheBlaze, and author.
Lawrence-Jones baronets, a title in the Baronetage of the United Kingdom
Lawrence W. Jones (born 1925), physics professor
Lawrence C. Jones (1893–1972), Vermont attorney and politician
L. E. Jones (1885–1969), English author

See also
Laurence Jones (1933–1995), Royal Air Force commander
 Laurence Jones (musician) (born 1992), singer-songwriter
Laurence C. Jones (1884–1975), founder and president of Piney Woods Country Life School, Mississippi
Larry Jones (disambiguation)